Hymenobacter frigidus is a Gram-negative, psychrophilic and rod-shaped bacterium from the genus of Hymenobacter which has been isolated from the ice core of the Muztagh Glacier from the Tibetan Plateau.

References

External links
Type strain of Hymenobacter frigidus at BacDive -  the Bacterial Diversity Metadatabase

frigidus
Bacteria described in 2017